Boscombe West is a ward in Bournemouth, Dorset. Since 2019, the ward has elected 2 councillors to Bournemouth, Christchurch and Poole Council.

History 
The ward was formerly used for elections to Bournemouth Borough Council, which it elected three councillors. The current ward has slightly different boundaries, covering part of the former Bournemouth ward of Boscombe East.

Geography 
The ward covers the western areas of Boscombe. It is part of the Bournemouth East parliamentary constituency.

Demographics 
Boscombe West is one of the most diverse wards in the whole of the South East Dorset conurbation. The average age of residents is older than the England and Wales average.

Councillors

Election results

2019

2011

References

External links 

 Listed Buildings in Boscombe West Ward, Bournemouth

Wards of Bournemouth, Christchurch and Poole